The 1928 United States presidential election in Missouri was held on November 6, 1928 as part of the 1928 United States presidential election. Voters chose 18 electors to the Electoral College, who voted for president and vice president. 

Missouri voted for the Republican nominee, Secretary of Commerce Herbert Hoover of California, over the Democratic nominee, Governor Alfred E. Smith of New York.

Hoover won Missouri by a margin of 11.43 percent. This was the last time Missouri was won by a Republican candidate until Dwight Eisenhower narrowly won the state in 1952.

Results

Results by county

See also
 United States presidential elections in Missouri

References

Missouri
1928 Missouri elections
United States presidential elections in Missouri